Mario Pérez may refer to:

 Mario Perez (artist) (born 1943), Cuban artist
 Mario Pérez (footballer, born 1927), Mexican midfielder
 Mario Pérez (footballer, born 1946), Mexican defender
 Mario Díaz Pérez (born 1960), Mexican footballer
 Mario Pérez Zúñiga (born 1982), Mexican footballer
 Mario Gaspar Pérez (born 1990), Spanish footballer for Villarreal CF
 Mario Pérez Saldívar (born 1939), Mexican long-distance runner